Erik Lindeberg (born 29 June 1979) is a Swedish sprint canoer who competed in the early 2000s. At the 2000 Summer Olympics in Sydney, he finished eighth in the K-4 1000 m event.

References
Sports-Reference.com profile

1979 births
Canoeists at the 2000 Summer Olympics
Living people
Olympic canoeists of Sweden
Swedish male canoeists
Place of birth missing (living people)
21st-century Swedish people